Domaniža is a village and municipality in Považská Bystrica District in the Trenčín Region of north-western Slovakia.

History
In historical records the village was first mentioned in 1268.

Geography
The municipality lies at an altitude of 391 metres and covers an area of 26.061 km2. It has a population of about 1487 people.

Genealogical resources

The records for genealogical research are available at the state archive "Statny Archiv in Bytca, Slovakia"

 Roman Catholic church records (births/marriages/deaths): 1670-1894 (parish A)

Sport 
Domaniža has football club TJ Partizán Domaniža, that plays in V. liga Severozápad HUMMEL ZsFZ.

See also
 List of municipalities and towns in Slovakia

References

External links

 
https://web.archive.org/web/20071116010355/http://www.statistics.sk/mosmis/eng/run.html
Surnames of living people in Domaniza

Villages and municipalities in Považská Bystrica District